The Halsema Highroad Point (also known as the Philippine Pali) is a vantage point  in Atok, Benguet, Philippines. It is situated on the Halsema Highway.

Background
The Halsema Highroad Point situated in the barangays of Cattubo and Paoay in Atok, Benguet has been reputed as the highest point in the Philippine Highway System for decades until 2019. The point is situated at the kilometer 53 mark of Halsema Highway and has a view deck where the towns of Atok, Tublay, Bokod and Kabayan as well as Mount Pulag is visible. It is also known as Philippine Pali due to the resemblance of its vicinity to Pali of Hawaii.

The point lost its official recognition as the highest point in the Philippine Highway System on February 26, 2019 when the Department of Public Works and Highways (DPWH) announced that it has verified the claim of the local government of Tinoc, Ifugao that a portion of the Kiangan-Tinoc-Buguias Road, which was converted into a national road by Republic Act No. 10551 in May 2013, in Mount Gui’ngaw is the highest point in the country's highway system.

References

Tourist attractions in Benguet
Highest points of countries